Governador Jorge Teixeira is a municipality located in the Brazilian state of Rondônia. Its population was 7,445 (2020) and its area is 5,067 km².

References

Municipalities in Rondônia